The Piper PA-31 Navajo is a family of twin-engined utility aircraft designed and built by Piper Aircraft for small cargo and feeder airlines, and as a corporate aircraft. Production ran from 1967 to 1984. It was license-built in a number of Latin American countries.

Development

In 1962, Piper began developing a six- to eight-seat twin-engined corporate and commuter transport aircraft under the project name Inca, at the request of company founder William T. Piper. Looking like a scaled-up PA-30 Twin Comanche, the PA-31 made its first flight on 30 September 1964, and was announced later that year. It is a low-wing monoplane with a conventional tail, powered by two  Lycoming TIO-540-A turbocharged engines in "tiger shark" cowlings, a feature shared with the Twin Comanche and the PA-23 Aztec.

As testing proceeded, two cabin windows were added to each fuselage side and the engines were moved further forward.

The PA-31-300 was certified by the FAA in June 1967, the only variant without turbocharged engines:  Lycoming IO-540-M1A5 engines driving two-bladed propellers. Unofficially, the initial model was referred to as the PA-31-310. Only 14 PA-31-300 were built in 1968 and 1969: the smallest variant production.

In January 1966, development of the PA-31P Pressurized Navajo had begun : Piper's first pressurized aircraft. The PA-31P (or PA-31P-425 unofficially) was certified in late 1969. It was powered by  Lycoming TIGO-541-E engines, had a longer nose, fewer and smaller windows,  fuel tanks in the engine nacelles and a one-piece airstair cabin entry door instead of the split pair of doors. The PA-31P was produced from 1970 to 1977. 

The 1971 Navajo B featured air conditioning, new storage lockers in the rear of the engine nacelles, increased baggage space, a third door next to the cabin doors for easier baggage  loading, and an optional separate door for the pilot to enter the cockpit.

Deliveries started in 1973, after a delay due to a flood caused by Hurricane Agnes at Piper's factory in Lock Haven, Pennsylvania.

The 1974 PA-31-325 Navajo C/R was base on the Navajo B. The Navajo C/R had , lower rated versions of the Chieftain's counter-rotating engines. It was certified in May 1974, and production commenced in the 1975 model year. The Navajo B was also superseded in 1975 by the Navajo C.

In May 1981, Piper established its T1000 Airliner Division at its Lakeland, Florida, factory. The PA-31-350T1020 (or T1020) was a PA-31-350 Chieftain optimized for and marketed for the commuter airline market, without the  auxiliary fuel tanks in each wing. Up to eleven seats could be fitted, and baggage capacity was reduced from  maximum. The first T1020 was delivered in December 1981. 

The PA-31T3 (T1040) was a hybrid with the PA-31-350T1020 main fuselage, and the nose and tail of the PA-31T1 Cheyenne I. The wings were similar to the Cheyenne I's, but with reduced fuel capacity and baggage lockers in the engine nacelles similar to those of the Chieftain. An optional underbelly cargo pod was also available. The Pratt & Whitney Canada PT6A-11 turboprop engines were the same as those of the Cheyenne I. Deliveries began in July 1982.

The PA-31P-350 Mojave was also a hybrid, a piston-engined Cheyenne. The Mojave combined the Cheyenne I fuselage with the Chieftain tail. The engines variants had intercoolers, and the rear part of the nacelles were baggage lockers. Certified in 1983, like the T1020 and T1040, the Mojave was produced in 1983 and 1984; combined production with the T1020 and T1040  was below 100 aircraft. Two experimental PA-31-353s were also built in the mid-1980s.

Licensed manufacture

The PA-31 series was manufactured under licence in several countries from kits of parts supplied by Piper. Chincul SACAIFI in Argentina assembled most of the series as the PA-A-31, PA-A-31-325, PA-A-31P and PA-A-31-350 and Aero Industrial Colombiana SA (AICSA) in Colombia assembled PA-31, PA-31-325 and PA-31-350 aircraft. The PA-31-350 Chieftain was also assembled under licence in Brazil by Embraer as the EMB 820C Navajo. In 1984, Embraer subsidiary company Indústria Aeronáutica Neiva began converting Embraer EMB 820Cs by installing Pratt & Whitney Canada PT6 turboprop engines; Neiva called the converted aircraft the Carajá.

Variants

Initial production version, also known unofficially as the PA-31-310.
PA-31-300 Navajo
Variant of the Navajo with normally aspirated engines; 14 built.
PA-31 Navajo B
Marketing name for 1971 improved variant with  Lycoming TIO-540-E turbo-charged piston engines, new airconditioning and optional pilot access door and optional wide utility door.
PA-31 Navajo C
Marketing name for 1974 improved variant with  Lycoming TIO-540-A2C engines and other minor improvements.
PA-31P Pressurized Navajo
Pressurized version of the PA-31 Navajo, powered by two 425-hp (317-kW) Lycoming TIGO-541-E1A piston engines.

Referred to as the "Navajo C/R" for Counter-rotating; variant of Navajo with counter-rotating engines introduced with the PA-31-350 Chieftain.  Lycoming TIO-540 / LTIO-540 engines

Stretched version of the Navajo with more powerful 350-hp (261-kW) counter-rotating engines (a Lycoming TIO-540 and a Lycoming LTIO-540) to eliminate critical engine issues.
PA-31P-350 Mojave
Piston-engined variant of the PA-31T1 Cheyenne I; 50 aircraft built.
PA-31-350T1020
Also known as the T1020/T-1020; variant of the PA-31-350 Chieftain optimised for commuter airline use, with less baggage and fuel capacity and increased seating capacity (nine passengers). First flight September 25, 1981. 21 built.
PA-31T3
Also known as the T1040/T-1040; turboprop-powered airliner with fuselage of the PA-31-350T1020, and wings, tail and Pratt & Whitney Canada PT6A-11 engines of PA-31T Cheyenne. First flight July 17, 1981. 24 built.
PA-31-353
Experimental version of PA-31-350; two built.

T1050
Unbuilt airliner variant with fuselage lengthened by  compared to the PA-31-350.
EMB 820C
Version of Chieftain built under license by Embraer in Brazil.
Neiva Carajá
Turboprop conversion of EMB 820C, fitted with two Pratt & Whitney Canada PT6A-27 engines flat-rated to 550shp.

Colemill Panther
Re-engined Navajo with  Lycoming TIO-540-J2B engines, four-blade Hartzell "Q-Tip" propellers and optional winglets. Conversion designed by Colemill Enterprises of Nashville, Tennessee. The supplemental type certificates (STCs) were subsequently sold to Mike Jones Aircraft Sales, which continues to convert PA-31, PA-31-325 and PA-31-350 variants with Colemill-developed features.

Operators

Civil
The Navajo family is popular with air charter companies and small feeder airlines in many countries, and is also operated by private individuals and companies.

Military
Chile
Chilean Navy purchased a single PA-31 in 1971.
Colombia
 Colombian Air Force
 Colombian Navy
 Dominican Republic
 Dominican Republic Air Force  operates two PA-31s as of December 2018.
Finland
 Finnish Air Force operated the PA-31-350 Chieftain in the liaison and light transport role.
France
 French Navy former operator
Honduras
 Honduran Air Force operates one PA-31 as of December 2018.
Kenya
 Kenya Air Force operated a Navajo Chieftain in the VIP role.
Spain
 Spanish Air Force
United Kingdom
 Aeroplane and Armament Experimental Establishment former operator

Accidents and incidents
 December 3, 1983: SouthCentral Air Flight 59, a PA-31-350 registered N35206, carrying eight passengers and one pilot, was on the takeoff roll at Anchorage International Airport when it collided head-on with Korean Air Lines Flight 084, a McDonnell Douglas DC-10-30 freighter HL7339. The Piper struck the DC-10's left and center main landing gear and three passengers sustained minor injuries; the DC-10 overran the runway and the three crew suffered serious injuries. Investigators determined that the Korean Air Lines pilot had become disoriented taxiing in fog, failed to follow correct procedures and confirm his position, and accidentally initiated takeoff from the wrong runway. Both aircraft were severely damaged and were written off.

Aircraft on display
Spain
 A PA-31P Pressurized Navajo formerly operated by the Spanish Air Force is on display at the Museo del Aire in Madrid.

Specifications (PA-31 Navajo)

See also

References

Citations

Bibliography 
 Barnett, Cliff. "Piper looks ahead". Flight International, 24 September 1983, Vol. 124, No. 3881. p.833.
 Bonelli, Regis and Pinheiro, Armando Castelar. New Export Activities in Brazil: Comparative Advantage, Policy or Self-Discovery, Research Network Working Paper #R-551, Inter-American Development Bank, July 2008.
Flight Magazine, Volume 54, No. 11, November 1965. Air Review Publishing Corporation, Dallas, Texas.
 Hoyle, Craig. "World Air Forces Directory". Flight International, 4–10 December 2018, Vol. 194, No. 5665, pp. 32–60. 
 Lambert, Mark. "In the air: Piper PA-30 Twin Comanche." Flight International, 12 September 1963, Vol. 84, No. 2844, pp. 468–470.
 Levy, Howard. "Piper consolidates at Lakeland". Flight International, 30 April 1983, Vol. 123, No. 3860, pp. 1152–1153. 
 Marsh, David. EUROCONTROL Trends in Air Traffic Volume 1: Getting to the Point: Business Aviation in Europe. European Organisation for the Safety of Air Navigation (EUROCONTROL) May 2006. Retrieved 2010-04-11.
 Michell, Simon. Jane's Civil and Military Aircraft Upgrades 1994–95. Coulsdon, UK: Jane's Information Group, 1994. .
 Piper Aircraft Inc. Customer Service Information File 2009 retrieved 2010-04-08
Piper Airplane Parts Catalog: PA-31 Navajo, PA-31-300 Navajo, PA-31-325 Navajo C/R; September 10, 2009. Piper Aircraft Corporation, Manual Part Number 753-703
Piper Navajo Information Manual, Revision 9, March 18, 1994. Piper Aircraft Corporation, Manual Part Number 761-723
Piper Navajo Pilot's Operating Manual, Revision 34, April 22nd 2002. Piper Aircraft Corporation, Manual Part Number 761-456
Piper T1020 Parts Catalog, Revision 10, September 10, 2009. Piper Aircraft Corporation, Manual Part Number 761-775
 Sixma, Herman J. and Jyrki Laukkanen. "Far Northern Air Force: The Finnish Air Arm Today". Air International, July 1986, Vol. 31, No. 1. pp. 7–13. .
 Taylor, John W. R. Jane's All The World's Aircraft 1976–77. London: Jane's Yearbooks, 1976, .
 Taylor, John W. R. Jane's All The World's Aircraft 1982–83. London: Jane's Yearbooks, 1982, .
 Wheeler, Barry C. "World's Air Forces 1979". Flight International, 4 August 1979, Vol. 116, No. 3672. pp. 333–386. 

1960s United States civil utility aircraft
Aircraft first flown in 1964
Low-wing aircraft
Navajo
Twin piston-engined tractor aircraft